St Hilda's College Boat Club, Oxford (SHCBC) is a rowing club part of the University of Oxford, England, located on the River Thames at Oxford. The club was founded in 1911, and competes primarily in the Torpids and Summer Eights bumps races in Oxford.

Pioneers of women's rowing 
St Hilda's College was the first college of Oxford to have women rowing on Thames, at the turn of the 20th century, with the boat club founded in 1911. It was St Hilda's student H.G. Wanklyn who formed OUWBC and coxed in the inaugural Women's Boat Race of 1927, with five Hilda's rowers. In 1969, the St Hilda's Eight made Oxford history when they became the first ever female crew to row in the Summer Eights. They placed 12th.

In the 1980s, Hilda's rowers Alison Gill and Pauline Janson were Olympians.

Recent years 
After 1976, the Women's 1st VIII consistently competed in the first division of both the Torpids and Summer Eights competitions, placing second on the river in 1981. After the admittance of men to the college in 2008, performance declined and the crew is currently placed in division three of both competitions.

Since 2009 the men's boat has steadily climbed the Torpids and Summer Eights leagues, most recently reaching division three of Torpids in 2022 and remaining in division four of Summer Eights.

'Blades' have recently been achieved by the women's team in 2016 and 2019, and by the men's team in 2013, 2016, 2017, 2018, and 2022. In 2016, the men's first boat was bumped in their 28th Summer Eights race, for the first time.

See also 
Oxford University Rowing Clubs

References 

Rowing clubs of the University of Oxford
Boat club
1911 establishments in England
Sports clubs established in 1911
Rowing clubs in Oxfordshire
Rowing clubs of the River Thames